Wang Chi (born 7 March 1970) is a Taiwanese swimmer. She competed in six events at the 1988 Summer Olympics.

References

External links
 

1970 births
Living people
Taiwanese female backstroke swimmers
Taiwanese female freestyle swimmers
Olympic swimmers of Taiwan
Swimmers at the 1988 Summer Olympics
Place of birth missing (living people)